Timecrimes is a 2007 Spanish science-fiction thriller film written by, directed by, and featuring Nacho Vigalondo. The film stars Karra Elejalde as Héctor, a man who unwittingly becomes part of a causal loop and must stop his other selves from continuing to exist.

Plot
In the Spanish countryside, a middle-aged man named Héctor and his wife Clara live in a home that they are renovating. Héctor scans the forest behind their house with binoculars and sees a young woman take off her T-shirt, exposing her breasts. When his wife goes shopping, he investigates and finds the woman on the ground, naked and unconscious. He is stabbed in the arm by a mysterious man with bloody bandages on his face. Fleeing and breaking into a mysterious nearby building, Héctor contacts a scientist by walkie-talkie, who warns him of the bandaged man and guides him to his location, promising safety. The scientist convinces Héctor to hide from the bandaged man, who is just outside, in a large mechanical device. However, when he leaves the machine, Héctor discovers that he has traveled approximately an hour back in time.

The scientist explains that the machine is an experimental time travel device, and refers to Héctor as "Héctor 2". The scientist tells him that they need to stay where they are and let events unfold. Despite the scientist's warning, Héctor 2 drives off in a car, passing a cyclist, only to be run off the road by a van, cutting his head, which he wraps using the bandage from his arm wound. The bandage turns pink from absorbing the blood. The cyclist approaches to see if he is all right – it is the woman he earlier saw in the forest. He proceeds to replicate events by making her undress in view of Héctor 1. When she runs away, he catches her, inadvertently knocking her out. He lays her out naked on the ground and then stabs Hector 1 in the arm when he arrives. The woman escapes. Héctor 2 returns to his home, where he hears a scream and chases a woman through his house and onto the roof. When he attempts to grab her, she slips and falls to her death. Seeing the body from the roof, Héctor 2 is horrified, believing he has killed his own wife.

Héctor contacts the scientist over a walkie-talkie and convinces him to lure Héctor's past self to the lab with warnings that he is being pursued. Driving to the lab, Héctor 2 insists that he must travel back one more time, despite the scientist revealing that there is a Héctor 3, who told him he must stop Héctor 2 from doing just that.

After removing his bandages, Héctor 2 convinces the scientist to send him back several seconds before he initially appears. He finds a van and runs Héctor 2 off the road, but crashes as well, knocking himself out. Upon waking, he informs the scientist he has failed to stop Héctor 2 by any means. He encounters the woman again, startling her into screaming, though she does not recognize him as her assailant. Since Héctor 2 has heard her scream, Héctor 3 and the woman flee to Héctor's house. They become separated. Héctor 3 finds and hides his wife, then realizes what has to happen / will happen / has already happened. He finds the woman, cuts her ponytail off, gives her his wife's coat, and tells her to hide upstairs. Héctor 2 chases her onto the roof. Héctor 3 sits on his lawn with his wife, as Héctor 2 accidentally kills the woman, then drives off – heading back to the lab to become Héctor 3. Emergency vehicles are heard approaching in the distance.

Cast
 Karra Elejalde as Héctor
 Candela Fernández as Clara
 Barbara Goenaga as the woman in the forest
 Nacho Vigalondo as the scientist
 Juan Inciarte as Occasional Héctor

Inspiration
In the documentary Future Shock! The Story of 2000 AD Nacho Vigalondo credits 2000 AD comic magazine as the biggest influence on Timecrimes, particularly the Alan Moore and Dave Gibbons one-off "Chronocops" from #310 (1983).

Music
The film's score was composed by Eugenio Mira. The film also uses the song "Picture This" by the American rock band Blondie, which director Vigalondo has stated he chose because he "love[s] the arrangement of the song and the chords. It's a happy song, but it's very sad and it's close to the movie".

Release 
The film premiered at Fantastic Fest in Austin, Texas, on 20 September 2007. It screened as the closing film of the Sitges Film Festival in October 2007. It had a theatrical release in Spain on 27 June 2008.

Reception

Critical response

The site's critical consensus reads, "Timecrimes is a low-budget thriller that's well-crafted and loaded with dark humor and bizarre twists." The film also has a score of 68 out of 100 on Metacritic based on 15 critics indicating "generally favorable reviews."

Jeannette Catsoulis of The New York Times noted the role of female frontal nudity and fast-paced action in making a time-travel film with no special effects. She praised writer/director Nacho Vigalondo's "audacity" in being able to create "urgency and disorientation from the thinnest of air" despite the film's low budget and lack of special effects.  Wesley Morris of The Boston Globe doubted whether Timecrimes actually makes sense but credited Vigalondo with making clever use of the time machine in order to allay the viewer's skepticism. Referring to the planned remake by director David Cronenberg, and alluding to Héctor's "human sequels", Morris concluded that Timecrimes "deserves a doppelganger".  In retrospective, A. A. Dowd of The A.V. Club interprets the film as an allegory about adultery, comparing Héctor's increasingly complex and confusing actions to those of someone lying to hide an affair.

Accolades

|-
| rowspan = "4" align = "center" | 2007 || rowspan = "3" | Fantastic Fest || colspan = "2" | Best Picture ||  || rowspan = "3" | 
|-
| colspan = "2" | Gold Medal of Jury Award Competition || 
|-
| colspan = "2" | Silver Medal of Audience Award Competition || 
|-
| Trieste Science+Fiction Festival || colspan = "2" | Asteroide Award for Best International Sci-fi Feature Film ||  || 
|-
| align =" center" rowspan = "4" | 2009 || rowspan = "3" | 64th CEC Medals || Best Original Screenplay || Nacho Vigalondo ||  || rowspan = "3" | 
|-
| Best Editing || José Luis Romeu || 
|-
| Newcomer Award || Nacho Vigalondo ||  
|-
| 23rd Goya Awards || Best New Director || Nacho Vigalondo ||  || 
|}

Remake
An English language remake was originally planned to happen with United Artists. However, the project never came into fruition and hit a deadline with no product. In 2011, the project was moved to DreamWorks with Steve Zaillian planning to write and produce.

See also
 List of Spanish films of 2008
 Temporal paradox
 Causality

References

External links
 
 
 
 

2007 films
Spanish science fiction thriller films
2000s mystery films
2007 science fiction films
2000s crime thriller films
Films set in 2006
Films set in Spain
Supernatural thriller films
Films about time travel
2000s Spanish-language films
Films directed by Nacho Vigalondo